Stegastes uenfi, the grizzed gregory, is a damselfish of the family Pomacentridae. It is known only from the coast of Brazil. The specific nae derives from the initials of the Unive Estadual do Norte Fluminense, the University that two of the authors were associated with.

References

uenfi
Fish described in 2000